Caldor may refer to:

 Caldor, a defunct chain of US discount department stores
 Caldor Fire, a 2021 wildfire in Eldorado County, California
 Caldor, California, a former company town in Eldorado County, California
 Diamond and Caldor Railway, a defunct common carrier railroad in Eldorado County, California